The Compass Careel 18 is an 18 ft long trailer sailer manufactured in Australia by David Rose Yachts.

The Careel 18 was originally built in 1968 by John Duncanson as a Duncanson 18, with David Rose taking over manufacturing and renaming the boats the Careel 18. It came out at a time when there was a boom in trailer sailers, but unlike many of its contemporaries, it remains popular today.

The boat was produced in three versions; Mk I (900kg), Mk II (1100kg) and Mk III (1200kg) with successive design changes including additional ballast and increases to deck and cabin height.

References

Trailer sailers
Sailing in Australia